The 1905 West Down by-election was held on 10 July 1905 after the incumbent Irish Unionist Arthur Hill resigned.  It was retained by the Unionist candidate Harry Liddell.

References

1905 elections in the United Kingdom
By-elections to the Parliament of the United Kingdom in County Down constituencies
1905 elections in Ireland